Sylvana Palma Windsor, Countess of Saint Andrews (née Tomaselli, previously Jones; born 28 May 1957) is a Canadian-born academic and historian. By virtue of marriage she is a member of the House of Windsor and is related to the British royal family as the wife of George Windsor, Earl of St Andrews, eldest son of Prince Edward, Duke of Kent and Katharine, Duchess of Kent and second cousin of King Charles III. A historian and lecturer at the University of Cambridge, she is usually known professionally as Dr. Sylvana Tomaselli.

Early life and ancestry
Tomaselli was born on 28 May 1957 at Placentia, Newfoundland, daughter of Maximilian Karl Tomaselli (formerly of Salzburg) by his wife Josiane née Preschez. By birth, Sylvana belongs to the Tomaselli family, an old and noble family that has risen to prominent positions in both Italy and Austria; she belongs to the Austrian branch of this family. She was educated in Canada and England.

Marriages and family 
She married firstly, on 25 December 1977 at Vancouver, John Paul Jones, son of Captain Geoffrey Jones of Barbados, but they divorced in 1981 without children.

She married secondly, on 9 January 1988 at Leith in Scotland, George, Earl of St Andrews, and they have three children:

 Edward Edmund Maximilian George Windsor, Lord Downpatrick (born 2 December 1988 at St Mary's Hospital in London)
 Lady Marina Charlotte Alexandra Katharine Helen Windsor (born 30 September 1992 at the Rosie Hospital in Cambridge)
 Lady Amelia Sophia Theodora Mary Margaret Windsor (born 24 August 1995 at the Rosie Hospital in Cambridge)

Lady St Andrews' Catholicism no longer precludes her husband's succession to the throne. Two of her children, Edward (2003) and Marina (2008), were received into the Roman Catholic Church, thereby surrendering their places in the line of succession to the thrones of the Commonwealth realms, although Lord and Lady St Andrews' younger daughter, Amelia, is still in remainder to the British Crown.

Academic career 
Tomaselli, who has received BA (UBC), MA (York, Ontario) and MA (Cantab) degrees, became a Fellow of St John's College, Cambridge in 2004. She specialises in French and British political theory in the 18th century, especially the history of womanhood, and has written about John Locke, Jean-Jacques Rousseau, David Hume, Mary Wollstonecraft and John Stuart Mill. She is the translator of Book II of the Seminar of Jacques Lacan, The Ego in Freud's Theory and in the Technique of Psychoanalysis. She teaches the three History of Political Theory Papers and is an affiliated Lecturer of the Faculties of History as well as of Social and Political Sciences.

She is a founding member of the European Centre for the Philosophy of Gender, Siegen, Germany, and is currently Director of Studies in History and Social & Political Sciences at St John's College in the University of Cambridge, and a tutor for postgraduates.

Tomaselli has been elected a Fellow of the Royal Historical Society.

References 

1957 births
Living people
20th-century French women writers
Alumni of Newnham College, Cambridge
Saint Andrews
British women historians
Canadian people of Austrian descent
Canadian people of French descent
Canadian people of Italian descent
Canadian Roman Catholics
Fellows of St John's College, Cambridge
Fellows of the Royal Historical Society
Sylvana
Mary Wollstonecraft scholars
People from Placentia, Newfoundland and Labrador
Translators of Jacques Lacan
Tomaselli family
University of British Columbia alumni
York University alumni